Spilostethus saxatilis is a species of bugs belonging to the family Lygaeidae, subfamily Lygaeinae.

Distribution
This species can be found in the Euro-Mediterranean-Turanian Region, with a more northern distribution relative to Spilostethus pandurus, at least as far east as Iran.

It is present in most of Europe (Albania, Austria, Bulgaria, Croatia, Czech Republic, France, Germany, Greece, Hungary, Italy, Poland, Portugal, Romania, Russia, Serbia, Slovakia, Slovenia, Spain, Switzerland, Turkey, Ukraine), and in the Oriental realm.

Habitat
These bugs prefer warm, dry open areas, meadows and fields. They can also be seen on the rocks (hence the species name saxatilis, which is derived from the Latin word saxum, meaning rock).

Description
Bodies of these bugs are characterized by black and red markings of different shapes. Pronotum is red, with two broad, irregularly shaped longitudinal black stripes. The hemilytra have black and red markings, while the membrane is black, without white spot. The outer edge of the corium is black. The connexivum is alternately red and black colored. Antennae and legs are black.

Biology
These polyphagous bugs feed on seeds and juices of various plants, especially Aspleniaceae, Asteraceae and Apiaceae. Spilostethus saxatilis is a univoltine species. The mating takes place in May and June. The new adult generation will appear in August. Adults overwinter.

References

External links
 Insectoid
 Insectes

Lygaeidae
Hemiptera of Europe